The Sopwith Swallow was a British parasol wing fighter aircraft of the First World War. A single example was built, but it saw no production, offering no performance advantages over contemporary biplanes.

Design and development
In June 1918, the Sopwith Aviation Company flew an unarmed parasol monoplane derivative of the Sopwith Camel, the Sopwith Monoplane No. 1, also known as the Sopwith Scooter. It used a normal Camel fuselage, with the wing mounted just above the fuselage, with a very small gap. The wing was braced using RAF-wire (streamlined bracing wires) to a pyramid shaped cabane above the wing. It was powered by a single 130 hp (97 kW) Clerget 9B rotary engine.

The Scooter, which was used as a runabout and aerobatic mount by Sopwith test pilot Harry Hawker, demonstrated excellent manoeuvrability, and formed the basis of a fighter derivative, originally the Monoplane No. 2, and later known as the Sopwith Swallow.

Like the Scooter, the Swallow used the fuselage of a Camel, but it had a larger, slightly swept, wing of greater wingspan and area, which was mounted higher above the fuselage to allow the pilot to access the two synchronised Vickers machine guns. It was powered by a 110 hp (82 kW) Le Rhône engine.

Operational history
The Swallow made its maiden flight in October 1918, and was delivered to RAF Martlesham Heath on 28 October 1918 for official testing. One possible role for the Swallow was as a shipboard fighter. Engine problems delayed testing of the Swallow, but when these problems were resolved, the Swallow proved to have lower performance than Le Rhône-powered Camels, and was discarded soon after testing was completed in May 1919.

The Scooter remained in use, and was given the civil registration K-135 in May 1919 (soon changed to G-EACZ). It was sold to Harry Hawker in April 1921, but was placed into storage when Hawker was killed in July. It was refurbished in 1925, and was used for aerobatic displays and for racing until 1927, when it was scrapped.

Specifications (Swallow)

See also

Notes

References

 Bruce J.M. British Aeroplanes 1914-18. London:Putnam, 1957.
 Bruce, J,M. War Planes of the First World War: Volume Three: Fighters. London: Macdonald, 1969, .
 Jackson, A.J. British Civil Aircraft 1919–1972: Volume III. London: Putnam, 1988. .
 Mason, Francis K. The British Fighter Since 1912. Annapolis, Maryland: Naval Institute Press, 1992. .
 Robertson, Bruce. Sopwith – The Man and His Aircraft. London: Harleyford, 1970. .

1910s British fighter aircraft
Scooter
Aerobatic aircraft
Aircraft first flown in 1918
Rotary-engined aircraft